Elston Albert Shaw (born 16 December 1972) is a Belizean sprinter. He competed in the men's 4 × 100 metres relay at the 1992 Summer Olympics.

References

External links
 

1972 births
Living people
Athletes (track and field) at the 1992 Summer Olympics
Belizean male sprinters
Belizean male long jumpers
Belizean male triple jumpers
Olympic athletes of Belize
Commonwealth Games competitors for Belize
Athletes (track and field) at the 1994 Commonwealth Games
Place of birth missing (living people)
Central American Games silver medalists for Belize
Central American Games bronze medalists for Belize
Central American Games medalists in athletics